Pseudoricia ovisigna is a moth of the family Notodontidae. It is found in Colombia and Ecuador.

The larvae feed on Rinorea apiculata.

References

Moths described in 1918
Notodontidae of South America